James Daniel Cowan (born 17 August 1989) is an English former first-class cricketer.

Cowan was born at Cambridge in August 1989. He was educated at Swavesey Village College, before going up to Anglia Ruskin University. While studying at Anglia Ruskin, he made two appearances in first-class cricket for Cambridge MCCU against Middlesex in 2011 and 2013. He scored 26 runs in his two matches, as well as taking 5 wickets with his left-arm medium-fast bowler, with best figures of 2 for 29. In addition to playing first-class cricket, he also played minor counties cricket for Cambridgeshire in 2010 and 2011, making three appearances in the Minor Counties Championship and two appearances in the MCCA Knockout Trophy.

References

External links

1989 births
Living people
Alumni of Anglia Ruskin University
Cricketers from Cambridgeshire
English cricketers
Cambridgeshire cricketers
Cambridge MCCU cricketers
Sportspeople from Cambridge